United Nations Security Council Resolution 218, adopted on November 23, 1965, after recalling previous resolutions on the topic, and Portugal's failure to implement them, the Council again demanded that Portugal withdrawal its military presence from her colonies and enter negotiations with political parties there regarding independence.

The Council also affirmed that the situation resulting from the conflict to retain the colonies seriously disturbed international peace and security and requested that all states refrain from supplying Portugal with any arms or war materials that would enable her to continue to repress the people of the territories under its administration.

The resolution passed with seven votes, while France, the Netherlands, United Kingdom and United States abstained.

See also
List of United Nations Security Council Resolutions 201 to 300 (1965–1971)
Portuguese Empire

References
Text of the Resolution at undocs.org

External links
 

 0218
20th century in Portugal
 0218
 0218
 0218
 0218
 0218
Portuguese Angola
Portuguese Mozambique
Portuguese Colonial War
Portuguese Guinea
Portuguese Cape Verde
November 1965 events